Xiangnan University (commonly abbreviated as XNU) is a full-time public university affiliated with the Hunan Provincial Education Department. The university was formed by amalgamating the former Chenzhou Teachers’ College, Chenzhou Medicine College, Chenzhou Pedagogical Academy, and Chenzhou Teachers Training School. The campus cover an area of over 100 hectares with a building area of 460,000 square meters.

Xiangnan University is a comprehensive university focusing on teachers training and medical education. It includes eight disciplines such as literature, science, medicine, education, management, engineering, economics, law, etc. Xiangnan University consists of 19 faculties and offers 30 Bachelor's degree programs (including two provincial key disciplines). The university has also established two provincial key building disciplines, three provincial fine courses and one provincial key laboratory. There are over 15,000 full-time students enrolled from 27 provinces all over China, plus 5,000 adult learners.

Overview
Xiangnan University has ample teaching and research facilities with a total investment of over ￥57,150,000 ($8,164,285). These include 1600 computers; 9378-seat multimedia classrooms; 974-seat language labs; an e-library with a collection of 1,100,000 volumes, over 2000 overseas and domestic journals and periodicals and various digital databases and network resources. The university has its own Journals and newspaper that appear in China abroad. The university campus computer networks are linked directly to the Internet and electronic reading-rooms; The University is equipped with language labs, multimedia classrooms, micro format classrooms and boasts more than 100 labs for computer science, physics, chemistry and medical science; The university also has advanced teaching and scientific research equipment such as CAI studios, 3D cartoon production system, infra-red spectrum, high performance liquid chromatography, automatic biochemistry analyzer, computer network system etc.. There are also over 200 work practicum bases for teachers training, medical education, tourism management, etc., The University also has a provincial model laboratory? (Basic Chemistry Lab) and three affiliated clinical teaching hospitals.    The university has a staff of over 1200, of which 800 are full-time teachers, 120 professors and chief physicians, 300 associate professors and associate chief physicians; over 346 have Master's or Doctor's degrees; six experts who enjoys the special subsidy of the State Council; nine teachers awarded with the title of national or provincial level Prominent Teacher; nine winners of Zeng Xianzi Teachers Foundation Award; nearly 50 members have the title of provincial-level Young Core Instructor; more than 50 notable experts and scholars from China and abroad are also invited to the university as part-time or visiting professors. The university has made great achievements in the field of teaching and scientific research. The university has presided and participated in over 100 national and provincial teaching and scientific research projects in past three years; and published 65 monographs, chiefly and jointly compiled 78 teaching texts and reference books. More than 2100 academic theses were published above the provincial level publications, of which 80 has been recorded in SCI and other international periodicals; more than 90 has been reprinted in full in the Information Center for Social Sciences of Renmin University of China. More than 19 projects have been awarded for achievements in scientific research at or above the provincial level.

The State's educational policy is fully implemented in Xiangnan University. The university stresses quality-oriented education and witnessed notable achievements. Students actively participate in all types and levels of entertainment and sports and have won a lot of honours for the university. Xiangnan University won the first prize in the 6th, 7th National University Students' Games (Group B) in terms of the total number of gold medals, medals and group scores; The university hosted the 2007, 2008 CUBA Qualifications. Being host, both the boys’ team and the girls’ team turned in fine performances.  In 2003, Xiangnan University won first prize in the National Mathematical Modeling Competition; Xiangnan University also won two state-level prizes in the National University Student's Festival of Arts; In the provincial-level pop test for junior college graduating students majoring in clinical medicine, Among six designed items, Xiangnan University got five number one.

Xiangnan University always places importance on developing international cooperation and exchanges. The University hopes to establish cooperative and exchange relations with foreign universities or foreign countries and regions.

References

External links 
 

Universities and colleges in Hunan
Chenzhou
Educational institutions established in 2003
2003 establishments in China